Brachycercus is a genus of small squaregilled mayflies in the family Caenidae. There are at least four described species in Brachycercus.

Species
 Brachycercus berneri Soldán, 1986
 Brachycercus harrisella Curtis, 1834
 Brachycercus nitidus (Traver, 1932)
 Brachycercus ojibwe Sun and McCafferty, 2008

References

Further reading

 

insect genera